"Never Be Anyone Else But You" is a song written by Baker Knight and recorded by Ricky Nelson with the vocal backing of the Jordanaires. The song reached #6 on the Billboard Hot 100 and #14 in the UK in 1959. It reached #3 in Norway.  The song was featured on his 1959 album, Ricky Sings Again.

The song is ranked #42 on Billboard magazine's Top 100 songs of 1959.

In 2020, the song was featured in a commercial for Campbell's Chicken Noodle soup.

Other versions
Heidi Brühl released a version as a single in the Germany in 1959 entitled "Wir werden uns finden".  It was the B-side to "Immer, wenn du bei mir bist", which reached #37 on the charts.
Ernie Sigley released a version as a single in the Australia in 1959 as the B-side to "It's Late".
Michael Cox sang the song on the show Oh Boy! in April 1959.
Rocky Sharpe and the Replays released a version as a single in the United Kingdom in 1981.  They performed the song on the television program Musikladen.
Cliff Richard released a version originally on his limited release album Rock 'n' Roll Silver in 1983 and again the following year on The Rock Connection album.
Emmylou Harris released a version as a single in 1990 that reached #92 on the country chart in Canada.  It was featured on her 1990 album, Brand New Dance.

References

1959 songs
1959 singles
1981 singles
1990 singles
Songs written by Baker Knight
Ricky Nelson songs
Cliff Richard songs
Emmylou Harris songs
Imperial Records singles
Philips Records singles